Baron Ernst Viktor Lorenz von Born (24 August 1885, Pernå - 7 July 1956) was a Finnish lawyer, farmer and politician. He served as Minister of the Interior from March 1931 to December 1932 and from December 1939 to May 1941, Minister without Portfolio in 1939 and Minister of Justice from 8 August to 17 November 1944. He was a member of the Parliament of Finland from 1919 to 1954, representing the Swedish People's Party of Finland (SFP). He was the chairman of the SFP from 1935 to 1945 and again from 1955 to 1956.

During the Continuation War, he was one of the signatories of the "Petition of the Thirty-three", which was presented to President Ryti by members of the Peace opposition on 20 August 1943.

References

1885 births
1956 deaths
People from Pernå
People from Uusimaa Province (Grand Duchy of Finland)
Finnish people of German descent
Swedish People's Party of Finland politicians
Ministers of the Interior of Finland
Ministers of Justice of Finland
Members of the Parliament of Finland (1919–22)
Members of the Parliament of Finland (1922–24)
Members of the Parliament of Finland (1924–27)
Members of the Parliament of Finland (1927–29)
Members of the Parliament of Finland (1929–30)
Members of the Parliament of Finland (1930–33)
Members of the Parliament of Finland (1933–36)
Members of the Parliament of Finland (1936–39)
Members of the Parliament of Finland (1939–45)
Members of the Parliament of Finland (1945–48)
Members of the Parliament of Finland (1948–51)
Members of the Parliament of Finland (1951–54)
Finnish people of World War II
University of Helsinki alumni